15-hydroxyprostaglandin dehydrogenase may refer to:

 15-hydroxyprostaglandin-D dehydrogenase (NADP+)
 15-hydroxyprostaglandin-I dehydrogenase (NADP+)
 15-hydroxyprostaglandin dehydrogenase (NAD+)
 15-hydroxyprostaglandin dehydrogenase (NADP+)